is a public high school on Chichi-jima in Ogasawara, Tokyo, Japan. The school is a part of the Tokyo Metropolitan Government Board of Education.

The school is the sole high school in the Ogasawara Islands.

See also

References

External links
 Ogasawara High School 

High schools in Tokyo
Tokyo Metropolitan Government Board of Education schools
Bonin Islands